Al-Farrā, he was Abū Zakarīyā Yaḥyā ibn Ziyād ibn Abd Allāh ibn Manṣūr al-Daylamī al-Farrā, was a Daylamite scholar and the principal pupil of al-Kisā’ī . He is the most brilliant of the Kūfan scholars. Muḥammad ibn Al-Jahm quotes Ibn al-Quṭrub that it was al-Farrā’s melodic eloquence and knowledge of the pure spoken Arabic of the Bedouins and their expressions that won him special favour at the court of Hārūn al-Rashīd.  He died on the way to Mecca, aged about sixty, or sixty-seven, in 822 (207 AH).

Life
Abū Zakarīyah ibn Ziyād al-Farrā’ was born in al-Kūfah into a family of Iranian Daylamī origin. He was a mawla (client, or, apprentice) of the Banū Minqar, although Salamah ibn ‘Āṣim said he was called al-‘Absī, i.e. of the Banū Abs.  Abū ‘Abd Allāh ibn Muqlah claimed Al-Yūsufī   called him Yaḥyā ibn Ziyād ibn Qāwī-Bakht ibn Dāwar ibn Kūdanār.  
The main details of his life come from Tha‘lab who quotes Aḥmad ibn Yaḥyā saying:
“If the expression spoils the meaning it is not the words of the Bedouin Arabs, or ‘pure’. But al-Farrā’ says it correctly because he based Arabic and grammar on the spoken language of the Arabs. He (al-Farrā) said: When the expression agrees with its meaning, the expression is correct.  Sībawayh errs because his etymological work is not founded in the expressions of the 'Desert Arabs' (Bedouin) and is without knowledge of their oral language and their poems, but instead relies on the poems of the urban Arabs and the pharaohs and applies the expression to the meaning.”
Al-Farrā’ was said to be called Farrā’ because he was 'free to speak'.

He knew the grammarians of al-Kūfah after the time of al-Kisā’ī's, whom he adopted. The Kūfans claimed that he borrowed much from Yūnus ibn Habīb but this was denied by the Baṣrans. He loved to speak and yet was retiring and pious.  He was a zealous adherent of Sībawayh, writing under his leadership. In his Al-Hudud he used philosophical terminology.

Tha'lab relates that al-Farrā’s was a friend of ‘Umar ibn Bukayr, the preceptor to the vizier of the caliph Al-Ma'mūn, who was called Āmir al-Ḥasan ibn Sahl.  Al-Farrā taught in the mosque next to his house. Umar approached him for exegetic advice on teaching Qur'ānic studies to the vizier, and so al-Farrā' dictated the book Ma‘ānī aI-Qur’ān for his students to copy out.  At the request of the caliph al-Ma'mun he dictated his Kitāb al-Ḥudūd, 'Classifications' (in poetry and grammar), as a project to instruct the students of al-Kisā’ī. Over the sixteen year period it took to complete, a muezzin reader read while al-Farrā’ explained the entire Qur’ān. He continued dictating long after most students had lost interest and only two remained.  Instruction without recourse to a text book was a good proof of memory and the mark of a great scholar.  Tha'lab makes a point of saying that al-Farrā’ was only once seen with a book and that was his dictation from a manuscript of the chapter ‘Mulāzim’.
A neighbour of Al-Farrā’s, named al- Wāqidī, remarked on al-Farrā’ particular use of philosophical terms in his literary dictations.   Al-Farrā’ lived most of his life at Baghdād and was very frugal, and even hunger did not concern him. He spent forty days annually at al-Kūfah, his native town, and distributed most of his considerable earnings from teaching among his people.

His father Ziad had his hand cut off in the war with Abī Tharwan and Abū Tharwan the mawla of the Banū Abs.
Ibn al-Nadīm lists Al-Farrā's associates as Ibn Qādim and Salamah ibn Āṣim, who was with him in his final illness, when his mind had gone.  Those who quoted him listed by Suyūṭī were; Qais ibn al-Rabī, Mandal ibn ‘Alī al-Kisā’ī, Salamah ibn Āṣim and Muḥammad ibn Jahm al-Samari, who transmitted his books.

Salamah ibn Āṣim said it was al-Ṭuwāl who preserved his only extant poetry in some verses quoted by Abū Ḥanīfah al-Dīnawarī:

Works
Al-'a’rāb fī Aswal al-‘Arabīya ‘The Arabians, about Arabic Roots’;
Al-Naṣb al-Mutwallad min al-Fa’al ‘Al-Naṣb [form of relation] Derived from the Verb’;
Al-Ma’rifat wa-l-Nakira ‘The Definite and the Indefinite’;
Min wa-Rubb “‘From’ and ‘Perhaps’”;
Al-‘Adad ‘Numbers’;
Mulāzamah wa-Ḥall ‘Invariable and Variable’;
‘Al-‘Imād ‘Pronoun between subject and predicate’;
Al-fi’l al-Wāqi‘ ‘The Transitive Verb’;
Inna wa 'Akhwatuha ‘"Inna" [a particle] and Its Sister Particle’;
Kay wa-Kay-la “‘In Order that’ and ‘Lest’”;
Ḥattā “‘Until,’ ‘So That’”;
Al-Ighrā''' ‘Instigating’;Al-Du‘ā’ ‘Calling, Addressing [as in prayer]’;Al-Nūnīn al-shadīdat wa-l-Khafīfa ‘The Two Forms of Nūn (N), Heavy and Light; Al-Istifhām ‘Interrogation’;Al-Jazā’ ‘Division’;Al-Jawāb ‘The Answer’;Alladhī, Man, wa-Mā “‘Who,’ ‘Who?,’ and ‘What’”;Rubb wa-Kam ‘‘Perhaps’ and ‘How Many?’’;Al-Qasam ‘The Oath’;Tanawīya wa-l-muthannā ‘Double and Dual’;Al-Nidā’ ‘The Call’ (Proclamation).Al-Nudba ‘The Elegy’;Al-Tarkhīm ‘Dropping the last letter of a noun’;An al-Maftūḥa ‘An (‘That') Spelled with Alif (open)’Idh, Idhā, and Idhan ‘forms of ‘if’’;Ma lam yasm fā’ilhu ‘What Does Not Mention Its Subject’;Law ‘"If", or "Notwithstanding", in Construction and Separate’;Al-Ḥikāya ‘Narrative’;Al-Taṣghīr() ‘Making the Diminutive’;Al-Tathnīyah  ‘Forming the Dual’;Al-Hujā’() ‘Spelling’;Rāja’ al-Dhikar ‘Referring Back’;Al-Fa’al al-Rabā’ī ‘Verb with Four Consonants’;Al-Fa’al al-Thalāthī ‘Verb with Three Consonants’;Al-Mu’rab min Makānīn ‘A Word Declined from Two Places;Al-Adghām ‘Making a Double Letter (Incorporation Together)’;Al-Hamza ‘Marking with a Ḥamzah’;Al-Ibnīya ‘Structures’;Al-Juma’ ‘The Plural’;Al-Maqsūr wa-al-Mamdūd ‘The Shortened and the Lengthened’;Al-Mudhakar wa al-Mu’anith ‘Masculine and Feminine’;Fa‘ala wa-Af‘ala’ Verbs and verbal forms;Al-Nuhī ‘The Interdiction’;Al-Ibtidā’ wa-al-Qaṭa’ ‘Stopping and Starting’;Mā Yajrā wa-ma lā Yajrā'' ‘What [Form] Is Current and What Is Not Current.’

See also

List of Iranian scientists and scholars

Notes

References

Bibliography

761 births
822 deaths
Scholars from the Abbasid Caliphate
9th-century linguists
9th-century philologists
9th-century scholars
Grammarians of Arabic
Grammarians of Kufa
Philologists of Arabic
8th-century Iranian people
9th-century Iranian people
Daylamites
Iranian grammarians
Iranian scholars